Blackfly is a 1991 Canadian animated short from Christopher Hinton, produced by the National Film Board of Canada and based on "The Black Fly Song" by Wade Hemsworth. It was nominated for an Academy Award and Genie Award for Best Animated Short. The song is performed in the film by Hemsworth with back-up vocals from Kate & Anna McGarrigle.

Synopsis
Wade Hemsworth's popular song, written in 1949 while he was working in Northern Ontario, is used as the source material for this delightful cartoon from the NFB. A young man goes to work for a survey crew in what is now Little Abitibi Provincial Park and encounters blackflies everywhere he goes. Over and over again, he encounters those pesky little bloodsuckers. He even goes to the moon, only to be swarmed there as well. His only recourse is to leave the North, vowing never to return.

References

External links
 (requires Adobe Flash)

1991 animated films
1991 films
Films directed by Christopher Hinton
National Film Board of Canada animated short films
Animated musical films
Films based on songs
Animated films about insects
Films set in Northern Ontario
1991 short films
Canadian animated short films
Quebec films
Canadian musical films
Films about flies
1990s Canadian films